Aramengo is a comune (municipality) in the Province of Asti in the Italian region Piedmont, located about  east of Turin and about  northwest of Asti.

Aramengo borders the following municipalities: Albugnano, Berzano di San Pietro, Casalborgone, Cocconato, Passerano Marmorito, and Tonengo.

References

Cities and towns in Piedmont